Namibia competed in the Olympic Games for the first time at the 1992 Summer Olympics in Barcelona, Spain.

Medalists

Competitors
The following is the list of number of competitors in the Games.

Athletics

Men
Track & road events

Boxing

Men

Swimming

Men

Women

References

Sources
Official Olympic Reports
International Olympic Committee results database

Nations at the 1992 Summer Olympics
1992
Oly